The 2022 Washington Huskies softball team represents the University of Washington in the 2022 NCAA Division I softball season.  The Huskies are coached by Heather Tarr, in her eighteenth season. The Huskies play their home games at Husky Softball Stadium and compete in the Pac-12 Conference.

Personnel

Roster

Coaches

Schedule

|-
! colspan=2 style=""| Regular Season: 22–11 (Home: 1–3; Away: 5–3; Neutral: 16–5)
|- valign="top" 
|

|- 
|

|- 
|

|- 
|

|}

Rankings

References

Washington
Washington Huskies softball seasons
Washington Huskies softball
Washington Huskies softball
Washington